Area D was one of the eight district electoral areas (DEA) which existed in Belfast, Northern Ireland from 1973 to 1985. Located in the west of the city, the district elected six members to Belfast City Council and contained the wards of Andersonstown; Ladybrook; Milltown; Saint James; Suffolk; and Whiterock. The DEA largely formed part of the Belfast West constituency.

History
Covering the upper parts of the Falls Road areas, the DEA was created for the 1973 local government elections. It combined most of the former Falls ward with parts of the Saint Anne's ward and parts of the former Lisburn Rural District. It was abolished for the 1985 local government elections. The number of wards in the area had increased to eight. Three of the wards formed part of a new Lower Falls DEA, together with the Falls and Clonard wards, formerly part of Area F. The remaining five wards formed the new Upper Falls DEA.

Results

1973

1977

1981

References

Former District Electoral Areas of Belfast
1973 establishments in Northern Ireland
1985 disestablishments in Northern Ireland